Oleksa Dovbush (born 1700, Pechenizhyn Kolomyia— died 24 August 1745) was a famous Ukrainian outlaw, leader of opryshky, who became a folk hero, often compared to Robin Hood.

Biography
Oleksa was born in the Hutsul village of Pechenizhyn in the Carpathian Mountains in the early 18th century. He became the leader of his own band that consisted of almost 50 members (leheni). Popular tradition portrays him as a protector to the poor people of the region. There are few written references left of him and his activities.

The many folk songs and the few prose legends that still survive in Prykarpattia portray him as a local hero who robbed the rich and helped the poor serfs, like the legendary Robin Hood. His residence is believed to be located near the city of Bolekhiv in Ivano-Frankivsk Oblast. It is a rock complex that is called the Rocks of Dovbush which was nominated in the seven historical and seven natural wonders of Ukraine. Dovbush's deeds became so admired that the tales of his acts spread beyond the Hutsul region to the neighboring Pokuttia and Podillya regions of western Ukraine. His portraits were sold at local market places. He was feared by Polish szlachta (landowning nobility). Once, a military expedition of 2000 soldiers, headed by Polish magnate Józef Potocki, was sent to stop his activities. Nonetheless, he could not be captured.  Dovbush was shot and mortally wounded by one Stefan, the husband of his lover Dzvinka, in 1745.

According to Hassidic legend, Dovbush at one time hid in the house of Baal Shem Tov and gave him his pipe as a token of friendship.

Legacy
After his death, his legacy was extended by several of his companions and/or people that idolized him: Vasyl Bayurak (a memorial plate is erected in Ivano-Frankivsk that mentions of his execution), Maksym Zalizniak, Ustym Karmaliuk, and many others.

His legend entered Ukrainian folklore and was the subject of various artistic works, by, among others, the writers Ivan Franko and Yuriy Fedkovych. A film was made about him, and there are streets and locations named after him.

See also
Peasant uprising
Ukrainian folklore
Juraj Janosik
Ustym Karmaliuk

Notes

References
Overview
Brief mentioning
The picture that mentions Bayurak

Further reading
See references cited by Paul R. Magocsi in Galicia: A Historical Survey and Bibliographic Guide (University of Toronto Press, 1983), p. 91

1700 births
1745 deaths
People from Ivano-Frankivsk Oblast
People from Ruthenian Voivodeship
Hutsuls
Outlaws